G12 Worship, formerly known as Soulfire Revolution, is a contemporary Christian and contemporary worship band from both Bogotá, Colombia and Miami, Florida, United States. They are signed to the Sparrow Records label, an imprint of EMI Christian Music Group.

Background 

Soulfire Revolution is from Bogotá, Colombia and Miami, Florida, United States, and first formed as a band in 2008. They call Mision Carismatica Interncional (MCI) home, which is located in Colombia. They originated in Miami, performing in English, Spanish and Portuguese. The band announced through YouTube a name change on August 2, 2017 to partner more closely with the other ministry band, Generation 12.

Members 

 Lorena Castellanos – lead vocals and keyboard
 Richard Harding – co-lead vocals, lead and rhythm-guitar
 Anthony Catacoli – lead guitar 
 Julian Gamba – bass guitar
 Paola Sanchez – drums

Discography

Studio albums

Awards and nominations
Aviva won the 2014 Dove Award for 'Spanish Language Album of the Year'.

References

External links
 

Musical groups established in 2008
Musical groups from Miami
Sparrow Records artists